Edgbastonia alanwillsi is a species of minute freshwater snail with an operculum, an aquatic gastropod mollusc or micromollusc in the family Hydrobiidae. It is currently the sole species within the genus Edgbastonia.

E. alanwillsi is endemic to western Queensland, Australia. It is only found in a small group of springs in the Edgbaston Reserve near Aramac, where it is assumed to be relictual.

See also 
 List of non-marine molluscs of Australia

References

External links

Hydrobiidae
Gastropods of Australia
Endemic fauna of Australia
Gastropods described in 2008
Freshwater molluscs of Oceania